Chambeyronia lepidota is a species of flowering plant in the family Arecaceae. It is found only in New Caledonia.

References

lepidota
Endemic flora of New Caledonia
Trees of New Caledonia
Conservation dependent plants
Taxonomy articles created by Polbot